Marid Mutalimov (born 22 February 1980 in Makhachkala, Dagestan) is a Kazakhstan wrestler of Kumyk ethnicity, who has won a bronze medal at the 2008 Summer Olympics.

References

External links
 
 

Kumyks
Olympic wrestlers of Kazakhstan
Wrestlers at the 2004 Summer Olympics
Wrestlers at the 2008 Summer Olympics
Olympic bronze medalists for Kazakhstan
Sportspeople from Makhachkala
Living people
1980 births
Olympic medalists in wrestling
Wrestlers at the 2006 Asian Games
Medalists at the 2008 Summer Olympics
Kazakhstani male sport wrestlers
Asian Games competitors for Kazakhstan
Asian Wrestling Championships medalists
20th-century Kazakhstani people
21st-century Kazakhstani people